Foreign policy of Donald Trump may refer to:

 The Foreign policy of Donald Trump (2015–16) (as a presidential candidate), or
 The Foreign policy of the Donald Trump administration (2017-21) (as President)